Rev. Alfred Courthope Benson Bellerby (26 January 1888 – 10 April 1979) was a British athlete and educator. He competed in the men's long jump and the men's high jump at the 1908 Summer Olympics.

He was the son of organist Edward Johnson Bellerby. He was an Army chaplain during the First World War. He was headmaster of King Edward's School, Witley, (1926–1951) and Governor of St Lawrence College, Ramsgate.

References

External links
 

1888 births
1979 deaths
Athletes (track and field) at the 1908 Summer Olympics
British male long jumpers
British male high jumpers
Olympic athletes of Great Britain
People from Margate
Olympic male high jumpers
20th-century English Anglican priests